Tak-e Zow (also known as Mīrzā Āqā’ī) is a village in Kakhk Rural District, Kakhk District, Gonabad County, Razavi Khorasan Province, Iran. At the 2006 census, its population was 39, in 10 families.

References 

Populated places in Gonabad County